Gas Transmission Northwest (GTN) is a 1353 mile long natural gas pipeline built in 1961 with a capacity of 2,900 million cubic feet per day. It brings gas from Alberta, Canada, beginning at Kingsgate, British Columbia and passing through Washington and terminates at Malin, Oregon then connecting to California, connecting to the Pacific Gas and Electric system. Prior to being purchased by TransCanada Corporation in 2004, it was named Pacific Gas Transmission. TransCanada subsequently sold 25 percent of its interest in GTN to TC PipeLines, LP, which connects via the Tuscarora Gas Pipeline. GTN's FERC code is 86.

See also

 List of North American natural gas pipelines

References

External links
Pipeline Electronic Bulletin Board

Natural gas pipelines in the United States
Natural gas pipelines in Canada
Canada–United States trade relations
TC Energy
Transport buildings and structures in British Columbia
Pipelines in Alberta
Natural gas pipelines in Washington (state)
Natural gas pipelines in Oregon
Natural gas pipelines in California